Sterculia oblonga, the yellow sterculia, is a commercial timber tree in the family Malvaceae. It is native to the tropical rainforests of Cameroon, Ivory Coast, Equatorial Guinea, Gabon, Ghana, Liberia, Nigeria, and Sierra Leone. It is threatened by habitat loss.

References

oblonga
Flora of West Tropical Africa
Trees of Africa
Vulnerable plants
Taxonomy articles created by Polbot